Senou Coulibaly (born 4 September 1994) is a Malian footballer who plays as a defender for Ligue 2 club Dijon. Born in France, he plays for the Mali national team.

Career
Coulibaly is a youth product of Cergy Pontoise FC, and joined FC Mantes in 2017.

On 13 June 2018, Coulibaly joined Ligue 1 side Dijon FCO from Mantes in the fourth division of France. He made his professional debut for Dijon in a 2–1 Ligue 1 win over Montpellier HSC on 11 August 2018, wherein he scored the game-winning goal in extra-time.

International career
Born in France, Coulibaly is of Malian descent. He debuted with the Mali national team in a friendly 1–1 tie with DR Congo on 11 June 2021.

References

External links
 
 
 
 DFCO Profile

Living people
1994 births
Sportspeople from Pontoise
Association football defenders
Citizens of Mali through descent
Malian footballers
Mali international footballers
French footballers
French sportspeople of Malian descent
Dijon FCO players
Ligue 1 players
Championnat National 3 players
2021 Africa Cup of Nations players
Footballers from Val-d'Oise